Minnesota State Highway 56 (MN 56) is a  highway in southeast Minnesota, which runs from its intersection with U.S. Highway 63 near the Iowa state line and Chester, Iowa, and continues north to its northern terminus at its junction with U.S. Highway 52 and State Highway 50 in Hampton.

Route description
Highway 56 serves as a north–south route in southeast Minnesota between Le Roy, Adams, Brownsdale, Hayfield, Dodge Center, West Concord, Kenyon, and Hampton.

Highway 56 begins near the Minnesota - Iowa state line and heads west through the towns of Le Roy, Adams, Taopi and Rose Creek.  Near Le Roy, Highway 56 passes near Lake Louise State Park.  The route then heads due north west of Rose Creek and has an interchange with Interstate Highway 90 five miles (8 km) east of Austin.

Highway 56 heads through northern Mower County and enters Dodge County north of Waltham.  State Highway 30 intersects this route just west of Hayfield.  Ten miles north of Hayfield, Highway 56 is concurrent with the U.S. Highway 14 bypass around Dodge Center.  After passing through West Concord, the route crosses into Goodhue County.

In Kenyon, Highway 56 intersects State Highway 60 and State Highway 246 north of the city.  The intersection of Highway 56 and State Highway 19 at Stanton is located between Northfield and Cannon Falls.  Highway 56 enters Dakota County near Randolph, and continues for ten more miles until it reaches its northern terminus at U.S. 52 and State Highway 50 at Hampton.

At its southern end, Highway 56 is officially designated as the Shooting Star Scenic Byway from U.S. 63 north to its interchange with Interstate 90.  This byway is so named because of the endangered wildflowers that bloom in June and July.

History
Highway 56 was authorized on November 2, 1920 between U.S. Route 16 and Kenyon. The route was extended south to U.S. Highway 63 and north through the Twin Cities to U.S. Highway 169 in Aitkin in 1933.

The route was then terminated to various locations in Saint Paul from 1963 to 1974.  The portion of Highway 56 through and north of Minneapolis was renumbered State Highway 47 in 1963.

Highway 56 had its northern terminus at what was then State Highway 3 in downtown St. Paul (now U.S. 52) from 1974 to 1994, and has ended at its current northern terminus at Hampton since 1994.

Part of the former route (Concord Street) from Interstate Highway 494 in South St. Paul to U.S. Highway 52 in Saint Paul is now marked as State Highway 156.  In addition, the portion of the former route beyond that (Concord Blvd.) running from Interstate 494 south to U.S. Highway 52 in Inver Grove Heights, MN is now designated as Dakota County Road 56.

Major intersections

References

056
Transportation in Fillmore County, Minnesota
Transportation in Mower County, Minnesota
Transportation in Dodge County, Minnesota
Transportation in Goodhue County, Minnesota
Transportation in Dakota County, Minnesota